The 2016–17 Women's EHF Champions League was the 24th edition of the Women's EHF Champions League, the competition for top women's clubs of Europe, organized and supervised by the European Handball Federation. CSM București were defending champions.

Team allocation
13 teams were directly qualified for the group stage.

TH = Title holders

Round and draw dates
The qualification and group stage draw will be held in Glostrup, Denmark.

Qualification stage

The draw was held on 29 June 2016 at 13:00 in Vienna, Austria. The twelve teams were split in three groups and played a semifinal and final to determine the last participants. Matches were played from 9 to 11 September 2016.

Qualification tournament 1

Qualification tournament 2

Qualification tournament 3

Group stage

The draw was held on 1 July 2016 at 13:00.

In each group, teams played against each other in a double round-robin format, with home and away matches.

Group A

Group B

Group C

Group D

Main round

The top three teams of each preliminary group advanced. Points obtained against qualified teams from the same group were carried over.

In each group, teams played against each other in a double round-robin format, with home and away matches.

Group 1

Group 2

Knockout stage

The first four placed teams from the main round qualified for the knockout stage.

Quarterfinals

Final four

Final

Awards and statistics

All-Star Team
The all-star team and awards were announced on 5 May 2017.

Goalkeeper:  
Right wing:  
Right back:  
Centre back:  
Left back:  
Left wing:   
Pivot:

Other awards
MVP of the Final Four:  
Best Coach: 
Best Young Player: 
Best Defence Player: 
Top scorer: , 98 goals

References

External links
Official website

 
Women's EHF Champions League
EHF
EHF